Piecki-Migowo is one of the quarters of the city of Gdańsk, Poland.  It consists of two parts: Piecki and Migowo. Populated by 23,593 inhabitants in an area of 3.8 km² (population density 6,224), 
Piecki-Migowo together are popularly called Morena. It is located on top of a hill more than 100 meters above sea level that used to be an example of Arcadian nature. It is an example of a multi-story housing estate that is claimed to fail to properly use the beauty of the landscape. The housing estate was built in the second half of the 1970s and in the 1980s. The construction areas are slowly being extended to the area of the former military training areas. The prevailing type of new structures are family houses or small buildings.

Piecki

In 1439 the Teutonic knights handed over the settlement of Pietzkendorf to Maciej from Łostowice (Schönfeld) and Jakub Czan, it consisted of 36 gardens on about 200 ha. The center of the village was located along modern Piecewskiej street. In 1577 the village was destroyed during the Danzig rebellion against Polish King Stephen Báthory. In 1698 Johann Uphagen became the chairman of the St. Elisabeth and Holy Ghost hospitals in Danzig, which leased the village. In the second half of the 18th century the Uphagen family built a Rococo mansion in Pietzkendorf, which consisted of three peasant farms and two taverns in 1793. At the turn of the 19th and 20th centuries, the manor house was expanded. In 1945 Pietzkendorf was renamed Piecewo by the new Polish authorities, in 1948 the current name was officially adopted. In 1954 the village was incorporated in the administrative boundaries of the city of Gdańsk.

Migowo
The settlement was first mentioned in 1379 as Emugow, in 1437 as Muckaw and later as Müggau. In 1506 it was leased by Peter Mellin, a councillor of Danzig, in the late 16th century a brickyard existed (around today's Belgradzka St. and Bułgarska St.). In the late 18th century, Müggau became a suburban residence of Danzig burghers, a mansion located in a Baroque park (currently ul. Myśliwska 6) was built. Müggau was incorporated in the City of Danzig administration on 26 March 1942, which was not recognized by Polish authorities after 1945. Müggau was renamed Migowo on 1 July 1947 and again incorporated into the City limits on 15 January 1954.

Modern development

In 1972 a development project of the Association of Polish Architects started, in the following years industrialized apartment blocks were built in the area of the villages. Morena is characterized by a very cold and extremely windy climate, in sharp contrast with neighbouring areas of Gdańsk. Air pollution is virtually nonexistent because of a sea breeze of over 40 km per hour.

The hill is connected with Wrzeszcz by a convenient bicycle route.

References

External links
 Map of Piecki-Migowo

Districts of Gdańsk